Cuauhtémoc (Mennonite Low German: Cuauhtemoc-Staut) is a city located in the west-central part of the Mexican state of Chihuahua. It serves as the seat of the municipality of Cuauhtémoc. The city lies 103 km (64 mi) west of the state capital of Chihuahua. As of 2015, the city of Cuauhtémoc had a population of 168,482. 3 languages are recognized as official in the city: Spanish, English, and Plautdietsch.

The population in 1953 was just under 3,000, composed almost entirely of Mexicans with the exception of foreign-born people who have gone there as traders. The town of Cuauhtémoc grew significantly after the coming of the Mennonites in the 1920s, for whom the city was a shopping destination. A railroad, a highway, and a bus line connected Cuauhtémoc with Chihuahua City.

Climate 
Cuauhtémoc has a semi-arid climate (Köppen climate classification BSk) moderated by its altitude. The city usually sees 1 or 2 snowfalls per year. Most of the precipitation falls during this time of the year, during the monsoon season.

Transportation 

In the early 1950s there were no improved roads leading from the hinterland into Cuauhtémoc. A four-lane highway, completed in 1986, connected the city with the city of Chihuahua, the state capital. Another highway connected Cuauhtémoc with Col. Anahuac, where a large pulp mill is located. The Gran Vision highway, which is to be continued to the west coast through the Sierra Madre Occidental mountains, joins the city to the western hinterlands, and another highway leaving the city passes through the Mennonite colonies to the north (Manitoba Colony).

Cuauhtémoc is a stop on the Ferrocarril Chihuahua al Pacífico, which connects Chihuahua City with Copper Canyon and Los Mochis.

Economy 

The apple industry, introduced to the area by a former Old Colony Mennonite, Enrique Wiebe, has contributed much to the rapid growth of the city, particularly with large apple corporations such as Grupo La Norteñita. The influx of American industry in the mid-1980s, is also attracting people from all over the Republic. Doctors, dentists, and lawyers abound. Elementary, secondary, preparatory, and technology schools are numerous. One agricultural school, incorporated with the University of Chihuahua, is located in Cuauhtémoc, and the one incorporated Mennonite elementary and secondary school, Alvaro Obregon, was located on the outskirts at Quinta Lupita, but is at Km. 11 (Blumenau) since 1990.

Mennonites 

The Cuauhtémoc area is the home of around 50,000 Plautdiestch-speaking Mennonites who live in the following colonies mostly north of the city: Manitoba Colony, Swift Current Colony, Ojo de la Yegua Colony, Santa Rita Colony, Santa Clara Colony and Los Jagueyes Colony.

The Mennonites settled in the San Antonio Valley, as far as 120 km (75 mi.) to the north of the town. There was a General Conference Mennonite Church in the town composed almost entirely of Mennonite refugees who came to Mexico after World War I. The growth of the Mennonite population due to natural increase and to additional immigration from Canada stimulated its economic activities. A small cereal factory was established by non-Mennonites, while a large cheese factory, slaughterhouse, and ice plant were erected by Mennonites (the Redekops) in the town. In 1947 the Mennonite Central Committee established a service unit in Cuauhtémoc to provide health services, recreational direction, and assistance in educational activities of German-speaking children

Although the city, formerly called San Antonio de los Arenales, developed only after the arrival of the Old Colony Mennonites in 1922, it has practically no Mennonites living in it. However, the streets and the numerous banks teem with them, especially on Monday mornings. Cuauhtémoc is the most important commercial center for Old Colony Mennonites in Chihuahua.

In the early 1930s the recent Mennonite immigrants from the Soviet Union (Rußländer) formed a Mennonite congregation in the town, but by 1987, it had ceased to exist. The few Mennonite families and General Conference Mennonite Church and Mennonite Central Committee workers living in the city in 1986 (5 families and 5 singles) worshipped mostly at the General Conference congregation at Kilometro 11. Cuauhtémoc was the first city to erect a senior citizens home under public or government jurisdiction. Its first matron was a Mennonite, Maria Giesbrecht, from the Santa Rita Colony (Nord Colony).

References

Link to tables of population data from Census of 2005 Instituto Nacional de Estadística, Geografía e Informática (INEGI)

Populated places in Chihuahua (state)
Populated places established in 1948
1948 establishments in Mexico
Old Colony Mennonites
Russian Mennonite diaspora in Mexico